Twilight Guardians was a power metal band from Salo, Finland. Formed in 1996, they were most famous for their 2007 album Ghost Reborn, and also achieved minor notoriety for their 2006 cover of Madonna's 1987 single "La Isla Bonita", from their third album Sin Trade.

They were signed to Spinefarm Records.

Discography
Land of the Kings (EP - 1998)
Tales of the Brave (2000, Musea)
Wasteland (2004, Spinefarm)
Sin Trade (2006, Spinefarm)
Ghost Reborn (2007, Spinefarm)
 Legacy (2011) Best Of

Members
Vesa Virtanen – vocals
Carl Johann Gustafsson – guitar
Mikko Tang – bass
Henri Suominen – drums
Jari Pailamo – synthesizers, Hammond organ

References

Ghost Reborn album liner notes

External links

 
Twilight Guardians on Myspace

Finnish power metal musical groups
Musical groups established in 1996
Musical groups disestablished in 2008